Eugene Francis Bunker (February 4, 1888 – May 29, 1956) was an American football player and coach. He served as the head football coach at the Montana College of Agriculture and Mechanic Arts—now known as Montana State University—in Bozeman, Montana in 1913, compiling a record of 2–2.

Head coaching record

College

References

External links
 

1888 births
1956 deaths
Wisconsin Badgers football coaches
Wisconsin Badgers football players
Montana State Bobcats football coaches
High school football coaches in Montana
People from Woodstock, Illinois
Players of American football from Illinois